2227 Otto Struve, provisional designation , is an asteroid from the inner regions of the asteroid belt, approximately 4.7 kilometers in diameter. The asteroid was discovered on 13 September 1955, by the Indiana Asteroid Program at Goethe Link Observatory near Brooklyn, Indiana, United States. It was named after Russian astronomer Otto Struve.

Orbit and classification 

The asteroid orbits the Sun in the inner main-belt at a distance of 1.8–2.6 AU once every 3 years and 4 months (1,222 days). Its orbit has an eccentricity of 0.17 and an inclination of 5° with respect to the ecliptic.

Physical characteristics 

As of 2016, the asteroid's composition, rotation period and shape remain unknown. According to the surveys carried out by NASA's Wide-field Infrared Survey Explorer with its subsequent NEOWISE mission, the asteroid measures 4.7 kilometers in diameter and its surface has an albedo of 0.388. Based on its absolute magnitude of 13.4, it has an estimated diameter between 5 and 13 kilometers, assuming an albedo in the range of 0.05 to 0.25. Since most asteroids in the inner main-belt are of a silicaceous rather than of a carbonaceous composition, with higheralbedos, typically around 0.20, the asteroid's diameter might be on the lower end of NASA's published conversion table, as the higher the reflectivity (albedo), the smaller the body's diameter at a constant intrinsic brightness (absolute magnitude).

Naming 

The minor planet is named in memory of Russian astronomer Otto Struve (1897–1963), discoverer of the two asteroids 991 McDonalda and 992 Swasey, and last of a remarkable dynasty of astronomers: the Struve family.

His great-grandfather, Wilhelm Struve (also see 768 Struveana), founded the Pulkovo Observatory near St. Petersburg in 1839; his grandfather (Otto), uncle (Hermann) and father (Ludwig) were also distinguished astronomers. Following a period of great privation and misery after World War I, he was invited by Edwin B. Frost (also see 854 Frostia) to come to the U.S. Yerkes Observatory in 1921. He started working in spectroscopy and remained a spectroscopist to the end of his days. He succeeded Frost as Yerkes director in 1932 and was the major force responsible for the establishment of the Texan McDonald Observatory in 1933. Managing editor of the Astrophysical Journal from 1932 to 1947 and became head of the astronomy department of the University of California in Berkeley in 1950. He received the Gold Medal of the Royal Astronomical Society in 1944, and the Bruce Medal in 1948. The lunar crater Struve was also named in his honor. The official naming citation was published by the Minor Planet Center on 13 July 1984.

References

External links 
 Asteroid Lightcurve Database (LCDB), query form (info )
 Dictionary of Minor Planet Names, Google books
 Asteroids and comets rotation curves, CdR – Observatoire de Genève, Raoul Behrend
 Discovery Circumstances: Numbered Minor Planets (1)-(5000)  – Minor Planet Center
 
 

002227
002227
Named minor planets
002227
19550913